Antoinetta was a schooner launched in 1812 in America, possibly as Marie Antoinette, and captured in late 1813. New owners renamed her Antoinetta. She performed two sealing or whaling voyages between 1814 and 1818. Thereafter she traded between London and Trinidad; she was no longer listed after 1826.

Career

Capture
On 18 December 1813  drove Antoinette ashore in the Basque Roads as Antoinette was on a voyage from Philadelphia, Pennsylvania to Bordeaux, Gironde, France. Antoinette was later refloated and taken in to Plymouth, Devon.

Sealing voyage
Under the command of Folger, master, Antoinetta (or Antonietta) left Britain on 23 August 1814. She returned on 22 July 1816 with 156 casks of oil and 9,000 skins.

Whaling voyage
Antoinette, R. Folger, master, departed Nantucket in 1816 with a destination of Patagonia. She was recorded as having gathered 1000 barrels of sperm oil. Lloyd's Register shows her master changing from Folger to Rochester.

Merchantman
In 1818 Antoinettas master changed from Rochester to R. Bibby, her owner from Rains to W. Ackers, and her trade from London-Buenos Aires to unspecified. In 1819 her trade became London-Trinidad. Antoinetta was last listed in Lloyd's Register in 1826 with H. Biddy, master, W. Achers, owner, and trade London-Trinidad.

Notes and citations
Notes

Citations

1812 ships
Captured ships
Whaling ships
Sealing ships
Individual sailing vessels
Age of Sail merchant ships
Merchant ships of the United Kingdom